War Babies is the debut and only album by the band War Babies, who disbanded in 1993.  The album was released by Columbia Records in 1991 and re-issued by German label UlfTone Music in 2003 and French company Bad Reputation  in 2007, respectively.

The album produced three singles, "Hang Me Up" (co-written by Tommy McMullin and Paul Stanley), "Cry Yourself to Sleep" (co-written by Brad Sinsel and Stanley), and "Blue Tomorrow" (a song dedicated to Andrew Wood from Mother Love Bone, who overdosed two years earlier).

In addition, the song "In the Wind" features in the 1992 film Buffy the Vampire Slayer, the forerunner to the later successful TV series.

Sinsel later commented about his writing session with Stanley, calling him, "one of the biggest egomaniacs I have ever come across in my career. He was rude and disrespectful and at some point, I'm playing (TKO's) "Kill the Pain" while we're warming up. So, he says, "I'm going to start playing some stuff and you just tell me if you hear anything". What came out of it was just "Kill the Pain" backwards. At some point he goes, "how about in this part we do blah, blah, blah" and it was off of Love Gun.  By now I've had enough of his remarks and I just looked at him and said, "look, it's not like I'm like Tommy (McMullin)" and he says, "what do you mean?" and I said, "it's not like I own a KISS doll, or something."

Track listing
 "Hang Me Up" – 4:04
 "In the Wind" – 4:25
 "Cry Yourself to Sleep" – 4:46
 "Sweetwater" – 4:15
 "Sea of Madness" – 4:56
 "Blue Tomorrow" - 5:56
 "Satellite" – 4:23
 "Death Valley of Love" – 3:45
 "Big Big Sun" – 3:28
 "Killing Time"  – 4:40
 "Care (Man I Just Don't)" – 4:08

Bonus tracks (on 2003 UlfTone and 2007 Bad Reputation re-issues)

<li>"Hang Me Up" (edit)
<li>"Cry Yourself to Sleep" (single)
<li>"Cry Yourself to Sleep" (guitar)

Credits
Band
 Brad Sinsel – lead vocals and acoustic guitar
 Tommy "Gunn" McMullin – lead guitar and background vocals
 Guy Lacey – rhythm guitar and background vocals
 Shawn Trotter – bass and background vocals
 Richard Stuverud – drums, percussion and background vocals

Additional musicians
 Benmont Tench – keyboards
 Mike "Bubba" Abercrombie – keyboards
 Mike Lennon – background vocals
 Mark Lennon – background vocals
 Kip Lennon – background vocals
 Todd Cerney – background vocals (2)
 Thom Panunzio – percussion

Production
Thom Panunzio – producer
Bill Kennedy - engineer
Nick Terzo – executive producer

References

External links
 Sleeze Roxx War Babies discography page

Albums produced by Thom Panunzio
1992 debut albums
War Babies (band) albums